The Såne-sheep is a breed of Danish origin. In the making of the breed, the purpose was to produce a hardy sheep that could produce a reasonable amount of meat being primarily grassfed, while it could be used for recreational purposes, landscaping and vegetation management. It is expected that eves in springtime may wean-off 2 lambs, in 6–8 months, with a slaughter weight of 20–28 kg.

The story of the Såne-sheep 
The breeding began in 1971 in the little place called Såne, at Esrum Lake, in the northern part of Zealand. To start with, Shropshire sheep were crossed with Karakul sheep. The shropshire contributed with its size, plus the fact, that the shropshire is known for not eating twigs and bark of trees and shrubs, unlike most other sheep breeds, a feature that is somewhat preserved in the Såne-sheep. The Karakul sheep contributed with its good health qualities, its moderation and coat color. Since then, the norvegian Rygja sheep was added to increase stomach capacity, in order for it to better absorb large amounts of lean diet, and to a lesser extent to improve wool quality. The breed was officially approved in 1991. Since then the Suffolk-sheep, to a lesser extent, has been used in an attempt to reduce and prevent inbreeding. However, not all breeders recognize animals with Suffolk blood as being pure-blooded.

Characteristics  
The head of the Såne-sheep, is black and likewise the hoofs. The lambs are born with black fur, which, however, turns into a brown pelt when they grow up. In older animals, the fur usually begins to turn grayish. In addition, the breed is polled in both sexes.

Ram size: 90–120 kg.

Eve size: 65–85 kg.

Lamb birth size: approx. 4.5 kg.

Sheep breeds originating in Denmark